Rohail Nazir (born 10 October 2001) is a Pakistani cricketer and a former captain of Pakistan's under-19 cricket team.

Career
He made his Twenty20 debut for Islamabad in the 2017–18 National T20 Cup on 22 November 2017. In December 2017, he was named in Pakistan's squad for the 2018 Under-19 Cricket World Cup. In December 2017, he was picked by Islamabad United as an emerging player for 2018 season.

In April 2018, he was named in Baluchistan's squad for the 2018 Pakistan Cup. He made his first-class debut for Islamabad in the 2018–19 Quaid-e-Azam Trophy on 1 September 2018, scoring 130 runs in the first innings. He made his List A debut for Islamabad in the 2018–19 Quaid-e-Azam One Day Cup on 6 September 2018.

In September 2019, he was named in Northern's squad for the 2019–20 Quaid-e-Azam Trophy tournament. In November 2019, he was named as the vice-captain of Pakistan's squad for the 2019 ACC Emerging Teams Asia Cup in Bangladesh. He was the leading run-scorer in the tournament, with 302 runs in five matches, including a match-winning century in the final. In December 2019, he was drafted by the Pakistan Super League (PSL) franchise Multan Sultans in Emerging category during the 2020 PSL draft. Later in the same month, he was named as the captain of Pakistan's squad for the 2020 Under-19 Cricket World Cup.

In June 2020, he was added to Pakistan's touring party for their series against England, after ten of the original squad tested positive for COVID-19 prior to departing. In October 2020, he was named in a 22-man squad of "probables" for Pakistan's home series against Zimbabwe. In November 2020, he was named in Pakistan's 35-man squad for their tour to New Zealand. In December 2020, he was shortlisted as one of the Men's Emerging Cricketer of the Year for the 2020 PCB Awards. In October 2021, following the conclusion of the 2021–22 National T20 Cup, he was named as the wicket-keeper of the tournament, after taking twelve dismissals.

In December 2021, he was signed by the Karachi Kings following the players' draft for the 2022 Pakistan Super League.

References

External links
 

2001 births
Living people
Pakistani cricketers
Islamabad cricketers
Islamabad United cricketers
Multan Sultans cricketers
Karachi Kings cricketers
Sportspeople from Islamabad